Apatelodes albipunctata is a moth in the family Apatelodidae first described by Herbert Druce in 1898. It is found in Mexico (Veracruz), Costa Rica, Nicaragua and Guatemala.

References

Apatelodidae
Moths described in 1898